This article is a list of historic places in St. Andrews, New Brunswick entered on the Canadian Register of Historic Places, whether they are federal, provincial, or municipal.

List of historic places

 ci

See also
 List of historic places in Charlotte County, New Brunswick
 List of historic places in New Brunswick
 List of National Historic Sites of Canada in New Brunswick

St. Andrews, New Brunswick
Buildings and structures in Charlotte County, New Brunswick